Making Good Again is a thriller novel  by Lionel Davidson.

Plot summary
In Germany to settle World War II reparations, James Raison is plunged into the old conflict between Jew and Nazi.

1968 British novels
British thriller novels
Novels set in Germany
Jonathan Cape books